The 1977 Texas Rangers season involved the Rangers finishing second in the American League West with a record of 94 wins and 68 losses. The 1977 Rangers were notable for having an American League record four managers in the same season. Frank Lucchesi began the season as the manager but team's board of directors decide to make a change after the Rangers entered June with a .500 record. Former Major League player and manager Eddie Stanky was introduced as the new manager on June 17 but changed his mind after one game and returned to his home in Alabama. Bench coach Connie Ryan served as the interim manager for six games before Billy Hunter was hired and led the team to a 60-33 record for the rest of the year.

Offseason 
On December 10, 1976, shortstop Danny Thompson died of leukemia. Thompson had played in 64 games for the Rangers in 1976.

Notable transactions 
 November 17, 1976: Bert Campaneris was signed as a free agent by the Rangers.
 November 23, 1976: Doyle Alexander was signed as a free agent by the Rangers.
 December 9, 1976: Jeff Burroughs was traded by the Rangers to the Atlanta Braves for Carl Morton, Adrian Devine, Ken Henderson, Dave May, Roger Moret, and $250,000.
 December 15, 1976: Dave Criscione was traded by the Rangers to the Baltimore Orioles for Bob Babcock.
 January 11, 1977: Dave Righetti was drafted by the Rangers in the 1st round (10th pick) of the 1977 Major League Baseball Draft.
 February 2, 1977: Fritz Peterson was released by the Rangers.
 February 5, 1977: The Rangers traded a player to be named later and cash to the Chicago Cubs for Darold Knowles. The Rangers completed the deal by sending Gene Clines to the Cubs on February 15.
 February 17, 1977: Brian Doyle, Greg Pryor and cash were traded by the Rangers to the New York Yankees for Sandy Alomar Sr.

Regular season 
For one June day in 1977, Eddie Stanky was drawn back into the major leagues as manager of the Rangers. After that day, he abruptly quit and left for Alabama, saying only that he was homesick.

Season standings

Record vs. opponents

Opening Day starters 
 Juan Beníquez
 Bert Blyleven
 Bert Campaneris
 Tom Grieve
 Mike Hargrove
 Toby Harrah
 Ken Henderson
 Jim Sundberg
 Claudell Washington
 Bump Wills

Notable transactions 
 April 1, 1977: Carl Morton was released by the Rangers.
 April 12, 1977: Steve Foucault was traded by the Rangers to the Detroit Tigers for Willie Horton.
 April 30, 1977: Mike Marshall was purchased by the Rangers from the Atlanta Braves.
 May 9, 1977: Roy Howell was traded by the Rangers to the Toronto Blue Jays for Jim Mason, Steve Hargan and $200,000.
 May 23, 1977: Dave Moates was purchased from the Rangers by the New York Yankees.
 June 7, 1977: John Butcher was drafted by the Rangers in the 1st round (18th pick) of the secondary phase of the 1977 Major League Baseball Draft.
 June 15, 1977: Dock Ellis was purchased by the Rangers from the Oakland Athletics.
 June 15, 1977: Jim Fregosi was traded by the Rangers to the Pittsburgh Pirates for Ed Kirkpatrick.

Roster

Player stats

Batting

Starters by position 
Note: Pos = Position; G = Games played; AB = At bats; H = Hits; Avg. = Batting average; HR = Home runs; RBI = Runs batted in

Other batters 
Note: G = Games played; AB = At bats; H = Hits; Avg. = Batting average; HR = Home runs; RBI = Runs batted in

Pitching

Starting pitchers 
Note: G = Games pitched; IP = Innings pitched; W = Wins; L = Losses; ERA = Earned run average; SO = Strikeouts

Other pitchers 
Note: G = Games pitched; IP = Innings pitched; W = Wins; L = Losses; ERA = Earned run average; SO = Strikeouts

Relief pitchers 
Note: G = Games pitched; W = Wins; L = Losses; SV = Saves; ERA = Earned run average; SO = Strikeouts

Awards and honors 
Jim Sundberg, Gold Glove, catcher, 1977
Juan Beníquez, Gold Glove, outfield, 1977

All-Stars 
All-Star Game
 Bert Campaneris, reserve

Other team leaders 
 Stolen bases – Bump Wills (28)
 Walks – Toby Harrah (109)

Farm system

Notes

References

External links 
1977 Texas Rangers team page at Baseball Reference
1977 Texas Rangers team page at www.baseball-almanac.com

Texas Rangers seasons
Texas Rangers season
Texas Rang